The Daily Standard may refer to:

 The Daily Standard (Brisbane), newspaper in Brisbane, Australia
 The Daily Standard (Missouri), newspaper in Sikeston, Missouri, United States
 The Daily Standard (Ohio), daily newspaper in Celina, Ohio, United States
 The Weekly Standard